Bhamo District is a district of the Kachin State in northern Burma (Myanmar). The capital is the city of Bhamo. The district covers an area of 10,742.9 km2. In 2002, the population of the Bhamo District was an estimated 363,300.  The district consists of four townships:

 Bhamo Township
 Mansi Township
 Momauk Township
 Shwegu Township

Bhamo District is bordered by:
 Dehong Dai and Jingpo Autonomous Prefecture of China to the east,
 Kyaukme District of Shan State to the south and southwest,
 Katha District of Sagaing Division to the west,
 Mohnyin District to the northwest, and
 Myitkyina District to the north and northeast.

References

Further reading

 
Districts of Myanmar
Kachin State